The following list is an overview of Baháʼí Houses of Worship (Mashriqu'l-Adhkár) constructed, under construction, or planned worldwide.

References

External links
 Baháʼí Houses of Worship: A Visual Overview (2020)
 Chronology on Bahai-library.com